Nikakis Kantzilieris (born 1943) is a former Cypriot football player.  He began his football career at Othellos Athienou but he became famous playing for APOEL. Nikakis was known for his speed and his acuteness. He had not been a great scorer but his abilities made him a serious threat for his opponents.  Playing for APOEL, he won the Cypriot Championship in 1965 and the Cypriot Cup in 1963, 1968 and 1969.

References

1943 births
Living people
APOEL FC players
Cypriot footballers
Cyprus international footballers
Sportspeople from Nicosia
Association footballers not categorized by position